Sinoun Nuth (born 10 October 1985 in Phnom Penh, Cambodia) is Cambodian footballer who plays for home town club Visakha in Cambodian Second League. He was called to Cambodia national football team at 2010 AFF Suzuki Cup qualification.

International goals

References

External links
 

1985 births
Living people
Cambodian footballers
Cambodia international footballers
Sportspeople from Phnom Penh
Association football forwards
Angkor Tiger FC players
Nagaworld FC players
21st-century Cambodian people